Lieutenant Colonel Ardeshir Burzorji Tarapore, PVC (18August 1923 – 16September 1965), was an officer in the Indian Army and a recipient of the Param Vir Chakra, India's highest award for bravery. After completing his schooling in Pune, Tarapore joined the Hyderabad Army, and was commissioned in January 1942. Initially he joined the infantry, but was later transferred to an armoured regiment, the 1st Hyderabad Imperial Service Lancers. During World War II Tarapore saw action in the Middle East.

After Hyderabad State was annexed by India in 1948, Tarapore was selected to join the Indian Army. He was commissioned again in April 1951, and was posted to the Poona Horse regiment, 17th Battalion. Later he attended a training course in the United Kingdom on the Centurion tank. During the Indo-Pakistani War of 1965, 17 Horse saw action in the Sialkot sector. Tarapore led the regiment in several tank battles between 11and16 September, and was killed in one such battle at Butur-Dograndi on 16September. Under his leadership the regiment destroyed sixty Pakistani tanks, while the Indians suffered the loss of nine.

Early life
Ardeshir Burzorji Tarapore was born on 18August 1923 in Bombay. Ratanjiba, one of Tarapore's ancestors, was a military leader under Chhatrapati Shivaji. The family name  "Tarapore" was the namesake of the village of Tarapur, Maharashtra. It was the leading village of those in the charge of Ratanjiba. Later, Tarapore's grandfather relocated to Hyderabad and started working in the Customs and Excise Department of the Nizam of Hyderabad. His father, B. P. Tarapore, was a scholar of Persian and Urdu languages; he worked for the same Customs and Excise Department.

Tarapore joined Sardar Dastur Boys' Boarding School, Pune, at the age of seven. He did not do well at academic subjects, but was a good sportsman. He completed his schooling in 1940, and was the school captain that year. Shortly after he applied for a commission in the Hyderabad Army, and was selected. He completed his initial training at the Officers' Training School (OTS) Golconda and OTS Bangalore. He was commissioned into the 7th Hyderabad Infantry as a second lieutenant on 1January 1942.

Military career

Popularly known as "Adi", Ardeshir Tarapore was unhappy joining the infantry, as he wanted to join an armoured regiment. When his battalion was being inspected by Major General Syed Ahmed El Edroos, then Commander-in-Chief of the Hyderabad state forces, a live grenade accidentally fell into a bay area during a live-ammunition training exercise. Tarapore quickly picked it up and threw it away. The grenade exploded mid-air inflicting shrapnel wounds to his chest. Major General Edroos witnessed his actions and was impressed. He summoned Tarapore to his office and congratulated him. Tarapore took the opportunity to request a transfer to an armoured regiment. The general agreed and transferred him to the 1st Hyderabad Imperial Service Lancers. During World War II, Tarapore and his unit saw action in the Middle East.

As a result of Operation Polo in 1948, Hyderabad merged with the Union of India, and its forces were eventually amalgamated into the Indian Army. Tarapore was selected for the Indian Army and was commissioned as a captain on 1April 1951. He was first posted on probation for two years to 'B' Squadron of the Poona Horse regiment, 17th Battalion, and later transferred to 'A' Squadron as its second-in-command. India acquired Centurion tanks in the early 1960s and Tarapore was one of the officers selected to attend a training course in the United Kingdom. He was promoted to major on 1 January 1958, and to lieutenant-colonel on 10 June 1965.

Battle of Chawinda

Beginning in April 1965, India and Pakistan engaged in a series of skirmishes across the Line of Control (LOC). In August, Pakistan attempted mass infiltration into Kashmir in Operation Gibraltar. On 5 August, Pakistani soldiers crossed the LOC dressed as Kashmiri locals, heading for various areas within Kashmir. After locals reported the presence of Pakistani troops, the Indian Army captured several disguised Pakistani soldiers and foiled the infiltration operation. On 1 September, Pakistan launched a counterattack, named Operation Grand Slam, to capture vital points that would cut off supply routes to Indian troops. This plan eventually was foiled by the Indian troops. Later on 6 September, Indian forces crossed the Radcliffe Line, marking the official beginning of the Indo-Pakistani War of 1965.

Indian I Corps was given the responsibility of capturing the Sialkot sector. Poona Horse was part of the 1st Armoured Division, attached to I Corps. It was tasked to isolate Sialkot from Lahore. On 11September 1965 Poona Horse launched an attack on Phillora. To surprise the Pakistanis, it was decided to attack Phillora from the rear. As part of the regiment, commanded by Lieutenant Colonel Tarapore, was attacking Phillora from Chawinda, it encountered Pakistani armour advancing from Wazirwali. Tarapore held his ground and attacked Phillora under enemy tank and artillery fire. When wounded he refused to be evacuated. His regiment successfully captured Wazirwali on 14September. On the 16th they advanced to capture Jassoran, supported by 9 Dogra, and Butur-Dograndi, supported by 8 Garhwal. In the latter battle his tank was hit several times. Tarapore was mortally wounded, and succumbed to his injuries. Under his leadership the regiment had destroyed sixty Pakistani tanks, while the Indians had suffered the loss of nine. According to one account, Pakistani tanks held their fire during his cremation.

Param Vir Chakra

Tarapore was posthumously awarded the Param Vir Chakra, for leading the regiment while injured, and inflicting significant tank losses on the Pakistani side, with an effective date of award of 11September 1965. The official citation reads:

His wife received the award on Tarapore's behalf from the President of India. Later, as her own health deteriorated, it was handed over to the regiment and preserved in its quarter guard.

Notes
Footnotes

Citations

References

Further reading

1923 births
1965 deaths
Gujarati people
Indian military personnel killed in action
Parsi people
Military personnel of the Indo-Pakistani War of 1965
Recipients of the Param Vir Chakra